Vida Gerbec (12 July 1925 – 22 November 2010) was a Slovenian gymnast. She competed in the women's artistic team all-around at the 1948 Summer Olympics.

References

External links
 

1922 births
2010 deaths
Slovenian female artistic gymnasts
Olympic gymnasts of Yugoslavia
Gymnasts at the 1948 Summer Olympics
Sportspeople from Ljubljana